St Mary's High School is a Catholic secondary school situated in the town of Limavady, County Londonderry, Northern Ireland.

History
The school was established in 1959.

Collaboration
St. Mary's is one of three secondary schools in Limavady, the others being Limavady High School and Limavady Grammar School. It collaborates with these schools and with St. Patrick College, Dungiven  and Rossmar School in the Roe Valley Learning Community. Through this partnership, the schools offer shared courses and facilities for their students.

Academics
The school initially only provided instruction for students up to GCSE level. In 1975, 'A' level provision was introduced. St. Mary's now offers a full range of subjects at both GCSE and A-Level.

In 2017/2018, 73.7% of its students who sat the A-level exams were awarded three A*-C grades.

School awards
 ICT Mark
 2008, 2011   Investors in People
 2010 Learning UK Post-Primary School of the Year
 Becta mark
 2009 Microsoft IT Academy
 2008 iNET
 2009 Home school access award
 Health Promoting school award

References

Catholic secondary schools in Northern Ireland
Secondary schools in County Londonderry
Limavady